Saying Goodbye is a Canadian television drama anthology series, which aired on TVOntario in 1990. The series consisted of five half-hour short drama films about people grappling with death, either dealing with grief after the death of a loved one or confronting their own mortality. Each episode was paired with a half-hour studio panel discussion on bereavement moderated by Roy Bonisteel.

The series was also sold on videotape for use in palliative care and grief counselling education programs.

Episodes

Critical response
John Haslett Cuff of The Globe and Mail praised the series as evidence that Canadians "can produce powerful, polished drama that doesn't ape American TV and actually has something interesting and important to communicate", and lamented that the series wasn't running on CBC Television so that the entire country could watch it.

Awards
As the series run crossed over the eligibility cutoff dates for the Gemini Awards, the series was eligible for both the 5th Gemini Awards in 1990 and the 6th Gemini Awards in 1992.

References

External links
 

1990s Canadian drama television series
1990 Canadian television series debuts
1990 Canadian television series endings
1990s Canadian anthology television series
TVO original programming
Canadian educational films